Yong Fujun (born February 15, 1981, in Shaanxi) is an archer from the People's Republic of China.

Yong represented China at the 2004 Summer Olympics in men's individual archery. He was defeated in the first round of elimination, placing 42nd overall.

References

1981 births
Living people
Archers at the 2004 Summer Olympics
Chinese male archers
Olympic archers of China
Sportspeople from Shaanxi
Archers at the 2006 Asian Games
Asian Games competitors for China
21st-century Chinese people